The Hoofdklasse is the second highest domestic cricket competition in the Netherlands. Eight teams play in the regular competition.

Teams

Previous years

This overview starts in 2010, when the poules were rescheduled and renamed. From this season onwards the 'Eerste Klasse' was changed to 'Hoofdklasse'.

References

External links
  Official website
  Bloemendaal CC homepage
  Groen & Wit homepage
  HCC homepage
  Kampong CC homepage
  Rood & Wit homepage
  Sparta Rotterdam homeepage
  VCC homepage
  VVV homepage

Dutch domestic cricket competitions
Cricket in the Netherlands